The Providence Reds were a hockey team that played in the Canadian-American Hockey League (CAHL) between 1926 and 1936 and the American Hockey League (AHL) from 1936 to 1977, the last season of which they played as the Rhode Island Reds.  The team won the Calder Cup in 1938, 1940, 1949, and 1956.  The Reds played at the Rhode Island Auditorium, located on North Main Street in Providence, Rhode Island, from 1926 through 1972, when the team affiliated with the New York Rangers and moved into the newly built Providence Civic Center.  The team name came from the breed of chicken known as the Rhode Island Red.

When the North American Hockey League folded in 1977, the Broome Dusters acquired the Reds franchise and moved them to Binghamton, New York, where they were known as the Binghamton Dusters, Binghamton Whalers, and Binghamton Rangers.  In 1997 the franchise was sold to Madison Square Garden and then moved to become the Hartford Wolf Pack. On November 27, 2010, they were renamed the Connecticut Whale to honor the NHL's Hartford Whalers; but changed their name back to the Wolf Pack in 2013.  It is the oldest continuously operating minor-league hockey franchise in North America, having fielded a team in one form or another since 1926 in the CAHL.  It is also the only AHL franchise to have never missed a season.

The AHL returned to Providence in 1992 in the form of the Providence Bruins. Formed in 2001, The Rhode Island Reds Heritage Society commemorates the existence of the franchise and keeps the memory alive. Their pinnacle event is an annual reunion that takes place during the first weekend in August.

Coaches
Jimmy Gardner (1926–29)
Sprague Cleghorn (1929–31)
Billy Coutu (1933–34)
Albert "Battleship" Leduc (1936–37)
Frederick "Bun" Cook (1938–39, 1940–43)
Johnny Mitchell (1943–44)
Irwin Boyd (1944–46)
Terry Reardon (1947–53)
Pat Egan (1953–55)
Jack Crawford (1955–60)
Phil Watson (1960–61)
Fern Flaman (1961–65)
Ivan Irwin (1965–66)
Dave Creighton (1969–70)
Larry Wilson (1971–72)
Larry Popein (1972–73)
John Muckler (1973–76)

Season-by-season results

 Providence Reds 1926–1936 (Canadian-American Hockey League)
 Providence Reds 1936–1976 ((International-)American Hockey League)
 Rhode Island Reds 1976–1977 (American Hockey League)

Regular season

Playoffs

Affiliations
Per HockeyDB:
Boston Bruins (1936–1938, 1958–1962, 1963–1969)
California Seals (1969–1971)
Chicago Black Hawks (1939–1941)
Colorado Rockies (1976–77)
New England Whalers (1976–77)
New York Rangers (1955–1958, 1971–1976)
St. Louis Blues (1968–69, 1975–76)
Toronto Maple Leafs (1942–43)

References

 
Ice hockey clubs established in 1926
Ice hockey clubs disestablished in 1977
Ice hockey teams in Rhode Island
Canadian-American Hockey League teams
Boston Bruins minor league affiliates
Chicago Blackhawks minor league affiliates
Toronto Maple Leafs minor league affiliates
New York Rangers minor league affiliates
St. Louis Blues minor league affiliates
California Seals minor league affiliates
Colorado Rockies (NHL) minor league affiliates
New England Whalers minor league affiliates
1926 establishments in Rhode Island
1977 disestablishments in Rhode Island